Smólsko may refer to the following places in Poland:

Smólsko, Łobez County
Smólsko, Myślibórz County
Smólsko Duże
Smólsko Małe